Vestbygd or Borhaug is a village in Farsund municipality in Agder county, Norway.  The village is located on the southwestern shore of the Lista peninsula, about  straight west of the village of Vanse.  The Farsund Airport, Lista is located on the east side of Vestbygd.  The Lista Lighthouse lies just west of the village.  The village has a small harbour, surrounded by a breakwater which protects it from the open North Sea.  Vestbygda Chapel is located in the village.  The fishing village once had a thriving boatbuilding business, but that is now closed.

References

Villages in Agder
Farsund